European Grid Infrastructure (EGI) is a series of efforts to provide access to high-throughput computing resources across Europe using grid computing techniques. The EGI links centres in different European countries to support international research in many scientific disciplines. Following a series of research projects such as DataGrid and Enabling Grids for E-sciencE, the EGI Foundation was formed in 2010 to sustain the services of EGI.

Purpose
Science has become increasingly based on open collaboration between researchers across the world. It uses high-capacity computing to model complex systems and to process experimental results.
In the early 21st century, grid computing became popular for scientific disciplines such as high-energy physics and bioinformatics to share and combine the power of computers and sophisticated, often unique, scientific instruments in a process known as e-Science.

In addition to their scientific value, on 30 May 2008 The EU Competitiveness Council promoted "the essential role of e-infrastructures as an integrating mechanism between Member States, regions as well as different scientific disciplines, also contributing to overcoming digital divides."

EGI is partially supported by the EGI-InSPIRE EC project.

History

The European DataGrid project was first funded in 2001 for three years as one of the Framework Programmes for Research and Technological Development series.
Fabrizio Gagliardi was project manager of DataGrid and its budget was about 12 million euro, with the full project named "Research and Technological Development for an International Data Grid".

A major motivation behind the concept was the massive data requirements of CERN's LHC (Large Hadron Collider) project.

EGEE
On 1 April 2004 the Enabling Grids for E-Science in Europe (EGEE) project was funded by the European Commission through the Directorate-General for Information Society and Media, led by the information technology division of CERN.
This 24-month project of the Sixth Framework Programme had a cost of over 46 million euro. The consortium included 70 institutions in 27 countries.
The LHC Computing Grid continued to be a major application of EGEE technology.
By 1 April 2006 the "in Europe" was dropped from the project name, but the acronym was kept as EGEE-II for Enabling Grids for E-sciencE. This two-year phase cost about 52.6 million euro.
The new name reflected a more global extent, such as a cluster of computers at the Institute of Microelectronic Systems in Malaysia.
By 2007 the EGI was supported by 36 countries.

A middleware software package known as gLite was developed for EGEE.

A third two-year project phase was called EGEE-III, running from 2008 to 2010.
On 30 April 2010 the EGEE project ended.
By 2009 the governance model evolved towards a European Grid Initiative (EGI), building upon National Grid Initiatives (NGIs).

Related projects

DILIGENT & D4Science 
A project called Diligent
  (DIgital LIbrary Infrastructure on Grid ENabled Technology) was funded from 1 September 2004 to 30 November 2007, and developed an open source software called gCube system
conceived to be interoperable with the EGEE technology. This project cost more than 8.9 million euro.
Follow-on projects called distributed collaboratories infrastructure on grid enabled technology 4 science (D4Science) cost about 3.9 million euro through the end of 2009, and 5.4 million euro until September 2011. These projects initiatied the development of the D4Science organization and its Data Infrastructure that is interoperable with the EGI services.

BEinGRID
A project on Business Experiments in GRID (BEinGRID) ran from 1 June 2006, through November 2009, with a cost estimated 23.6 million euro.
The project published 25 case studies.
One participant observed in 2008 "a reluctant and slow take-off of Grid technology by the industry."

Yaim

YAIM was initially called Yet Another Installation Method in 2007 when developed at CERN.

YAIM was implemented to configure grid services, but also can be a general purpose configuration tool independent from the grid middleware. YAIM aimed to provide simple configuration methods that can be used to set up uniform grid sites but can also be easily adapted to meet the needs of larger sites. To adapt to local requirements, it was implemented as a set of bash scripts. To support EGEE's component based release model YAIM 4 was modularized and a YAIM core is supplemented by component specific scripts, distributed as separate rpms.

YAIM's modular structure allows distributed and asynchronous development for the quickly changing configuration requirements of the Grid Middleware.

The hierarchical configuration storage - which is to reflect the architecture of a grid site - and the configurable function behavior implement the local settings along with YAIM's default configuration.

Design study 
The EGI Design Study (EGI_DS) project was launched in September 2008 and continued until the end of December 2009. The project was partially funded by the European Commission's 7th Framework Programme in order to: evaluate requirements and use cases, identify processes and mechanisms for establishment, define the structure, and initiate the organization.

The study was directed by Dieter Kranzmüller, and cost about 3.9 million euro.
In October 2008 site selection for EGI was begun.
Participants included 37 national projects.

Structure
In March 2009, the policy board of the EGI announced it would be hosted in Amsterdam, the Netherlands at the Science Park Amsterdam.
The EGI.eu foundation was officially formed on 8 February 2010 in Amsterdam.
The name change included using infrastructure as the third word for the acronym, to reflect the transition from a series of short-term research projects to a more sustainable service.

National Grid Initiatives (NGI) support scientific disciplines for computational resources within individual countries. 
The EGI is governed by a Council of representatives from each member NGI, which controls an executive that manages the international collaboration between NGI, so that individual researchers can share and combine computing resources in international collaborative research projects.

The governance model of the EGI coordinating the collaboration of National Grid Initiatives uses general policies of co-operation and subsidiarity adopted in the European Research Area.

A 32-million-euro project named the EGI-Integrated Sustainable Pan-European Infrastructure for Research in Europe (EGI.INSPIRE) was funded in September 2010 under direction of Steven Newhouse.
A 1.5-million-euro project called e-ScienceTalk was funded in 2010 for 33 months to support websites and publications covering the EGI.
It followed an earlier programme known as GridTalk that was funded from 2008 to 2010.

See also
 Supercomputing in Europe
 eScience

References

External links
 Official EGI web site
 

Computer networks
Cyberinfrastructure
European Union technology policy
Information technology organizations based in Europe
Supercomputing in Europe